Bernardo Humberto Cerezo Rojas (born 21 January 1995) is a Chilean footballer who currently plays for Ñublense as right back or midfielder.

Career
He debuted on 9 September 2012 in a match against Santiago Wanderers for the 2012 Copa Chile.

Career statistics

Club

References

External links
 

1995 births
Living people
Chilean footballers
Chilean Primera División players
Primera B de Chile players
Deportes La Serena footballers
Deportes Santa Cruz footballers
Universidad de Chile footballers
Santiago Wanderers footballers
Chile under-20 international footballers
2015 South American Youth Football Championship players
Association football midfielders
Association football fullbacks